James De La Montanya (March 20, 1798 – April 29, 1849) was an American politician who served one term as a U.S. Representative from New York from 1839 to 1841,

Biography 
Born in New York City, De La Montanya resided in Haverstraw, New York.
Supervisor of Haverstraw in 1832 and 1833.
He served as member of the State assembly in 1833.

Congress 
De La Montanya was elected as a Democrat to the Twenty-sixth Congress (March 4, 1839 – March 3, 1841).

Death 
He died in New York City April 29, 1849.
He was interred in the Barnes family burial ground, Stony Point, New York.

References

1798 births
1849 deaths
American people of Spanish descent
Hispanic and Latino American state legislators in New York (state)
Democratic Party members of the United States House of Representatives from New York (state)
Democratic Party members of the New York State Assembly
People from Haverstraw, New York
American people of Catalan descent
19th-century American politicians